Robert Lisjak (born 5 February 1978) is a Croatian retired football goalkeeper who played for NK Funtana.

Career statistics

References

1978 births
Living people
Sportspeople from Koprivnica
Association football goalkeepers
Croatian footballers
NK Slaven Belupo players
NK Istra 1961 players
HNK Rijeka players
NK Osijek players
NK Istra players
Croatian Football League players